"Ding-a-Ling" is a song performed by British rappers Stefflon Don and Skepta. It was released as the second single from Stefflon Don's extended play Hurtin' Me – The EP on 16 November 2017 through Polydor Records. The song peaked at number 64 on the UK Singles Chart.

Background
Talking to NME about the collaboration with Skepta, Stefflon Don said, "We actually didn’t go in the studio together, but I know Skepta and we talk, we’re friends. He’s cool, very humble. It’s very much a banger, but I’ll let you decide."

Music video
A music video to accompany the release of "Ding-a-Ling" was first released onto YouTube on 16 February 2018.

Track listing

Charts

Release history

References

2017 songs
2017 singles
Stefflon Don songs
Skepta songs
Songs written by Skepta
Songs written by Stefflon Don